Woodland Beach is a census-designated place (CDP) and unincorporated community in Monroe County in the U.S. state of Michigan.  The population was 1,899 at the 2020 census.  The CDP is located within Frenchtown Charter Township.

Woodland Beach and its surrounding communities are served by Jefferson Schools.

Geography

The communities include Erie Shores, Grand Beach, Indian Trails, and Woodland Beach. The CDP stretches from South Grove Drive on the south to Stony Creek on the north. The majority of the CDP lies southeast of North Dixie Highway with a small portion of the Woodland Beach community extending northwest of North Dixie Highway.

The community was named for its wooded location and beachfront on Lake Erie.

Demographics

As of the census of 2000, there were 2,179 people, 794 households, and 605 families residing in the CDP. The racial makeup of the CDP was 98.12% White, 0.23% African American, 0.18% Native American, 0.09% from other races, and 1.38% from two or more races. Hispanic or Latino of any race were 0.87% of the population.

There were 794 households, out of which 38.3% had children under the age of 18 living with them, 59.6% were married couples living together, 10.2% had a female householder with no husband present, and 23.8% were non-families. 20.3% of all households were made up of individuals, and 7.2% had someone living alone who was 65 years of age or older.  The average household size was 2.74 and the average family size was 3.15.

In the CDP, the population was spread out, with 28.1% under the age of 18, 9.6% from 18 to 24, 32.5% from 25 to 44, 22.6% from 45 to 64, and 7.2% who were 65 years of age or older.  The median age was 34 years. For every 100 females, there were 100.8 males.  For every 100 females age 18 and over, there were 98.1 males.

The median income for a household in the CDP was $45,417, and the median income for a family was $47,212. Males had a median income of $36,296 versus $23,571 for females. The per capita income for the CDP was $17,824.  About 7.2% of families and 7.1% of the population were below the poverty line, including 7.0% of those under age 18 and none of those age 65 or over.

References

Unincorporated communities in Monroe County, Michigan
Census-designated places in Michigan
Michigan populated places on Lake Erie
Unincorporated communities in Michigan
Census-designated places in Monroe County, Michigan